Andriy Vasylyovych Andreychuk (born 17 February 2003) is a professional Ukrainian football striker who plays for FC Oleksandriya.

Career
Born in then Rozhniativ Raion, Andreychuk is a product of the local Nebyliv youth sportive school and Prykarpattia Ivano-Frankivsk youth sportive system.

After spent career in the teams of amateur or lower level, after a short trial period, in July 2021 he signed a deal with the Ukrainian Premier League club FC Oleksandriya and made his debut for this side as the second half-time substituted player in the away winning match against SC Tavriya Simferopol on 22 September 2021 in the Round of 32 of the Ukrainian Cup.

References

External links 
 
 

2003 births
Living people
Ukrainian footballers
FC Prykarpattia Ivano-Frankivsk (1998) players
FC Oleksandriya players
Ukrainian First League players
Association football forwards
Sportspeople from Ivano-Frankivsk Oblast